Eternal(s) or The Eternal may refer to:

 Eternity, an infinite amount of time, or a timeless state
 Immortality or eternal life
 God, the supreme being, creator deity, and principal object of faith in monotheism

Comics, film and television
 Eternals (comics), a fictional race of superhumans in the Marvel Comics universe
 Eternals (film), a 2021 film based on the comics characters
 Eternal (film), a 2005 horror film
 The Eternal (film) or Trance, a 1998 horror film
 Eternal (Doctor Who), a fictional race of cosmic beings from the TV series Doctor Who
 Eternal Pictures, an international film distribution company
 "Eternal", an episode of the TV series Eleventh Hour
 Eternal, a fictional warship captained by Andrew Waltfeld in the Gundam anime universe

Music
 Eternal (group), British girl group
 The Eternal (band), Australian rock band 
 Eternal, British doom metal band featuring Electric Wizard member Jus Oborn
 Eternal Records, an American record label
 Eternal (record label), a Taiwanese record label

Albums
 Eternal (Branford Marsalis album) or the title song, 2004
 Eternal (Eternal album), 1999
 Eternal (Isley Brothers album) or the title song, 2001
 Eternal (Jamie O'Neal album), 2014
 Eternal (Klaus Schulze album), 2017
 Eternal (Malevolent Creation album) or the title song, 1995
 Eternal (Samael album), 1999
 Eternal (Stratovarius album), 2015
 Eternal (War of Ages album) or the title song, 2010
 The Eternal (album), by Sonic Youth, 2009
 Eternals (album) or the title song, by Seventh Avenue, 2004

Songs
 "Eternal" (Jin Akanishi song), 2011
 "Eternal", by Bone Thugs-n-Harmony from E. 1999 Eternal
 "Eternal", by Bruce Dickinson from Tyranny of Souls
 "Eternal", by Chance the Rapper from The Big Day
 "Eternal", by David Banner from MTA2: Baptized in Dirty Water
 "Eternal", by Depeche Mode from Spirit
 "Eternal", by Evanescence from Origin
 "Eternal", by Front Line Assembly from Total Terror
 "Eternal", by Gothminister from Utopia
 "Eternal", by Holly Herndon from Proto
 "Eternal", by Into Eternity from The Scattering of Ashes
 "Eternal", by Johnny Hates Jazz from Magnetized
 "Eternal", by Mushroomhead from XIII
 "Eternal", by P.O.D. from Payable on Death
 "Eternal", by Shadows Fall from Somber Eyes to the Sky
 "Eternal", by William Joseph from Within
 "Eternal", by Wumpscut from Blutkind
 "The Eternal", by Joy Division from Closer

Video games 
 Eternal (video game), collectible card video game
 Vegas Eternal, an esports team in the Overwatch League

See also
 Eternalism (disambiguation)
 Eternity (disambiguation)
 Permanent (disambiguation)
 Transcendence (disambiguation)